This is a list of European colonial administrators responsible for the territory of Portuguese Mozambique, an area equivalent to modern-day Republic of Mozambique.

List

(Dates in italics indicate de facto continuation of office)

For continuation after independence, see: List of presidents of Mozambique

See also
 History of Mozambique#Portuguese Mozambique (1498–1975)

Sources
 http://rulers.org/rulm2.html#mozambique
 http://www.worldstatesmen.org/Mozambique.htm
 African States and Rulers, John Stewart, McFarland
 Guinness Book of Kings, Rulers & Statesmen, Clive Carpenter, Guinness Superlatives Ltd
 Heads of State and Government, 2nd Edition, John V da Graca, MacMillan Press 2000

Political history of Portugal
History of Mozambique
List
Mozambique